"Diamonds Are for Heather" is the second Christmas special episode of the BBC sitcom, Only Fools and Horses. It was first broadcast on 30 December 1982, five days after Christmas. In the episode, Del goes out with Heather, a single mother with a son.

Synopsis
On a November evening at The Nag's Head, Del Boy is feeling miserable due to his loneliness and lack of a family. He cheers himself up by ordering a mariachi band to sing "Old Shep". He also meets an attractive woman named Heather, who is drinking alone at the bar. Del charms her and they walk home together.

When he arrives at her flat, Del discovers that Heather has a son named Darren, aged three and a half, and a husband named Vic, who has not returned since joining a very long queue at the Job Centre 18 months earlier.

Over the next six weeks, Del and Heather's romance blossoms, Del forms a bond with Darren, and with the relationship strengthening, Del decides to propose to Heather, even if it means leaving Rodney and Grandad.

However, at a candle-lit curry dinner, Heather refuses Del's proposal, because her husband Vic wrote to her one-week earlier and is now living in Southampton, working as a department store Father Christmas. He also wants to give his marriage with Heather another go by asking her and Darren to move in with him. Heather says she never knew Del had fallen in love with her and instead thinks of him as a brother. Heather then says goodbye to Del, who manages to cheer himself up by paying some carol singers to sing "Old Shep".

Episode cast

Episode concept
 The idea for the script was to demonstrate Del's love for children, and that he really could be a family man if he put his mind to it.

Music
 Fat Larry's Band: "Zoom"

References

External links

1982 British television episodes
British Christmas television episodes
Only Fools and Horses special episodes